Henry Smith (25 August 1882 – 25 February 1957) was a former Australian rules footballer who played with Melbourne in the Victorian Football League (VFL).

Notes

External links 		

1882 births
Australian rules footballers from Victoria (Australia)
Melbourne Football Club players
1957 deaths